Tetraulax is a genus of longhorn beetles of the subfamily Lamiinae.

Species 
Containing the following species. containing the following species:

 Tetraulax affinis Breuning, 1938
 Tetraulax albofasciatus Breuning, 1935
 Tetraulax albolateralis Breuning, 1940
 Tetraulax albovittipennis Breuning, 1961
 Tetraulax gracilis Breuning, 1938
 Tetraulax junodi Breuning, 1950
 Tetraulax lateralis Jordan, 1903
 Tetraulax lateraloides Breuning, 1948
 Tetraulax maynei (Lepesme & Breuning, 1955)
 Tetraulax minor Breuning, 1958
 Tetraulax pictiventris (Chevrolat, 1857)
 Tetraulax rhodesianus Breuning, 1955
 Tetraulax rothi Lepesme & Breuning, 1955
 Tetraulax subunicolor Breuning, 1960
 Tetraulax unicolor Breuning, 1961

References

Tetraulaxini